Ever Oasis is an action-adventure role-playing video game developed by Grezzo and published by Nintendo for the Nintendo 3DS handheld game console. Revealed at E3 2016, the game was released in North America, Europe, and Australia in June 2017 and in Japan the following month. It was directed and produced by Koichi Ishii, the creator of the Chocobo and Moogle as well as the Mana series at Square Enix.

The story sees the player character, a young Seedling born from the Great Tree, working together with a water spirit to build the last oasis in a vast desert and helping out new residents along the way. The gameplay blends action role-playing elements with town management and dungeon crawling. Upon release, critical reception was generally positive, with points of praise going to the presentation and feedback loop of town building and management.

Plot
Ever Oasis tells the story of Tethu/Tethi, a young Seedling, who with the help of a Water Spirit named Esna creates an oasis after Tethu/Tethi's brother, Nour, gets kidnapped and the Oasis falls to Chaos. As the player journeys to find more residents, they fight the creatures that have been taken over by Chaos. On the adventure, the player discover several villages belonging to other races, such as the Drauk, the Serkah and the Lagora. Together with new allies, the player must work together with them to create the perfect Oasis as Tethu/Tethi continues to uncover the mystery of what happened to his/her brother.

Gameplay
In the game, players try to build a prosperous oasis by completing missions in dungeons and caves in the desert. Players can form a party of up to three characters and battle enemies that are possessed by Chaos in real-time combat with the ability to switch between three party members. Players can forage for materials in caves and puzzle-filled dungeons that can be used to restock Bloom Booths. The Bloom Booths can produce Dewadems, which are a form of currency. Other Seedlings can join the player's oasis and can create their own unique Bloom Booth, which can be ranked up through restocking and completing quests. There are some Seedlings, however, that cannot create Bloom Booths. Members of other tribes who the players meet in their journey can help by joining on missions and exploring for materials. These materials can also be used to synthesize equipment and items at the player's treehouse. The game is influenced by ancient Egyptian aesthetics. It is considered a spiritual successor to the Mana series.

Development
Ever Oasis was announced at E3 2016. An announcement trailer was shown and a demo with mission gameplay was played on stream, although the game was not playable for the public at the event. A free demo was made available to the public at E3 2017. The demo was also released on the Nintendo eShop.

Reception

Ever Oasis received mainly positive reviews from critics, based on 52 reviews on Metacritic. It also received 8.9 out of 10 from IGN. Brendan Graeber of IGN called the gameplay "fun instead of tedious". The game received a 5.5 out of 10 from Polygon with writer Allegra Frank citing low difficulty and shallow gameplay as issues with the game.

References

External links

2017 video games
Action role-playing video games
Fantasy video games
Nintendo 3DS games
Nintendo 3DS-only games
Nintendo 3DS eShop games
Nintendo games
Role-playing video games
Video games developed in Japan
Video games set in the Middle East
Video games featuring protagonists of selectable gender